Sergey Tsinkevich (born 19 September 1976) is a Belarusian professional football referee and former player. He has officiated matches of the Belarusian Premier League since 2008.

Tsinkevich became a FIFA referee in 2010.

References

External links
 
 
 

1976 births
Living people
Belarusian football referees
Belarusian footballers
FC Dnepr Mogilev players
FC Osipovichi players
FC Torpedo-BelAZ Zhodino players
Association football defenders